Erineus or Erineos may refer to:
 a synonym for the rove beetles genus Clidicus
 Erineos (Ερινεός), a municipality in northeastern Achaea, Greece
 Erineus (city), one of the four Greek cities of the Doric Tetrapolis
 Erineus (Achaea), a town of ancient Achaea, Greece
 Erineus (Thessaly), a town of ancient Thessaly, Greece
 the ancient name for the river Erineo in Sicily, south of Syracuse